"Light Years" is a song by the British funk and acid jazz band Jamiroquai, originally released in 1994 as a song from their second studio album, The Return of the Space Cowboy. It was released as a single on 12 February 1995 but failed to chart on the UK Singles Chart due to little promotion of the track.

Background
In the United States, the song peaked at number six on the Billboard Hot Dance Club Play chart, mainly because the American version of the physical single features three mixes of the song by popular producer David Morales. The American release of The Return of the Space Cowboy also features a live version of "Light Years", performed in Marseille in December 1994, as a bonus track. Two main versions of the song exist: the radio edit, running at 3:59, and an album version, which lasts for 5:53. The music video for the track shows the band snowboarding down St. Anton. Whilst many of the David Morales mixes remain unreleased in the United Kingdom, an edited version of the True Power Mix was available in the region on a mini 3-inch CD, only available through the Coca-Cola Euro '96 promotion.

Critical reception
Larry Flick wrote in a Billboard review of the single, "Jamiroquai complements a horn-riddled funk throwdown with savvy remixes that flirt with mainstream house and hip-hop concepts without eliminating the quirky tone of the original version." Pan-European magazine Music & Media commented, "When J.K quotes his master by saying "now I get that sunshine in my life", we don't have to tell you what the best track off Space Cowboy sounds like. Wonderful, of course, and soulful."

Music video
A music video was produced to promote the single, directed by Christian Stevenson. It was later published on Jamiroquai's official YouTube channel in November 2009. The video has amassed almost 1 million views as of October 2021.

Track listings
 UK CD single
 "Light Years" (edit) – 3:59
 "Scam" (live) – 5:13
 "Journey to Arnhemland" (live) – 5:39
 "We Gettin' Down" (live) – 9:31

 US 12-inch vinyl
A1. "Light Years" (Way Gone Mix)
A2. "Light Years" (True Power Mix)
B1. "Light Years" (4 to Da Floor Mix)
B2. "Light Years" (album version)
B3. "Light Years" (album instrumental)

Charts

Release history

References

1995 singles
1995 songs
Jamiroquai songs
Songs written by Jason Kay
Songs written by Toby Smith
S2 Records singles